Skyways Express AB was a Swedish airline that operated regional and domestic scheduled services. With its corporate head office on the property of Stockholm-Arlanda Airport in Sigtuna Municipality, Sweden, its main hub was at Stockholm-Arlanda Airport. The airline was placed into administration on 22 May 2012. Previously its head office was at Eurostop köpcenter, Cederströms slinga, Arlandastad.

History 
The airline was established in 1987 and was previously known as Avia. It acquired Salair on 15 July 1991, Highland Air in March 1997 and Air Express in 1999. A partnership was forged with Scandinavian Airlines (SAS) which acquired a 25% stake in April 1998.  The owners were Salenia (72.7%), SAS (25%) and Janus (2.3%). The operational division of Skyways was separated from the sales division in 2009. During 2010 there was some restructuring regarding ownership. SAS sold its share of the company at a loss, and eventually it was acquired by the asset management company Manswell Enterprises Limited, controlled by Ihor Kolomoyskyi. In 2011 Skyways merged with another Manswell controlled company, the Gothenburg-based airline City Airline, as Skyways. It also bought the Danish airline Cimber Sterling and developed the intention to become Scandinavia's biggest regional airline.  As of December 1, 2010 the operation, sales and marketing of the airline functioned again as one unit under Avia Express continuing the use of the brand Skyways.

On 22 May 2012, Skyways Express AB and City Airline AB filed for bankruptcy; Cimber Sterling had filed for bankruptcy earlier that month.

Destinations 

In May 2012, Skyways operated to the following destinations:

Partners
Blue1
Widerøe
Air Baltic
Estonian Air
Finnair

Fleet 

In August 2010 the Skyways Express fleet included the following aircraft:

See also
 Airlines
 Transport in Sweden

References

External links 

Skyways Express
Skyways Express fleet

Airlines established in 1993
Airlines disestablished in 2012
Defunct airlines of Sweden
European Regions Airline Association
SAS Group
Swedish companies established in 1993
Swedish companies disestablished in 2012